Kleinensiel is a railway station located in Kleinensiel, Germany. The station is located on the Hude-Blexen railway. The train services are operated by NordWestBahn. The station has been part of the Bremen S-Bahn since December 2010.

Before the Weser tunnel was opened, the railway crossing adjacent to the station was part of one of the main ferry approaches to cross the Weser river, often resulting in delays for motorists when closed. A bit south of the station, a freight track branches off the line to serve the KKU nuclear power plant.

Train services
The following services currently call at the station:

Bremen S-Bahn services  Nordenham - Hude - Delmenhorst - Bremen

References

Railway stations in Lower Saxony
Bremen S-Bahn